This article concerns the period 779 BC – 770 BC.

Events and trends
778 BC—Agamestor, Archon of Athens, dies after a reign of 17 years and is succeeded by his son Aeschylus.
777 BC—Death of Pārśva or Pārśvanātha (c. 877–777 BCE), the twenty-third Tirthankara of Jainism.
776 BC–394 AD—Era of the ancient Greek Olympic Games.
776 BC—First Olympic Games, according to Diodorus Siculus (of the 1st century BC).

773 BC—Ashur-Dan III succeeds his brother Shalmaneser IV as king of Assyria.
771 BC—Spring and Autumn period of China's history begins with the decline of the Zhou Dynasty as Haojing is sacked by Quanrong nomads, King You is killed and his successor, King Ping is forced to move the capital to Chengzhou. End of the Western Zhou Dynasty. Beginning of Eastern Zhou Dynasty.
771 BC—Traditional Birthdate of Romulus and Remus, Romulus as the traditional founder of Rome.
770 BC—Beginning of the Eastern Zhou Dynasty in China as King Ping of Zhou becomes the first King of the Zhou to rule from the new capital of Chengzhou (later known as Luoyang).

References